Tim Clissold (Chinese name: 祈立天) is a Western writer on business in China. He is the author of a memoir detailing how he helped the Wall Street trader Jack Perkowski to invest, lose and recover over $400 million in mainland China as the country first opened up to foreign direct investment. His book detailed the numerous ways the fund lost money and the steps it took to recover it. Clissold was president of the foreign-invested ASIMCO Technologies before parting company from Perkowski, who claims never to have read the book that gave him the nickname Mr. China. Time Magazine described Mr China as 'an instant classic.' 

Clissold has since written two more books, Chinese Rules and Cloud Chamber. The Financial Times Shanghai correspondent wrote of Chinese Rules: 'Read Tim Clissold, the British businessman whose book Mr China is probably the best I've ever come across about China. Now he has written another: it's about what makes China tick - for foreigners who can clearly hear it ticking but can't quite figure out why.'

Clissold is a Senior Research Associate at the Cambridge University China Forum at Jesus College, Cambridge and non-executive director of London Stock Exchange quoted investment trusts, Henderson Far East Income and Baillie Gifford China Growth.

Bibliography
Mr. China: A Memoir, HarperBusiness, 2005
Chinese Rules, Harper Collins, 2014
Cloud Chamber, Commercial Press of China, 2021

References

External links
Tim Clissold, Mr Wang's chemical factory, Chinadialogue.net, 18 September 2007
Tim Clissold's website

Living people
Economy of China
British non-fiction writers
Writers about China
British male writers
Year of birth missing (living people)
Male non-fiction writers